Double Live Annihilation is the second official live album by the band Annihilator, released in 2003.

Track listing

Personnel
Joe Comeau - vocals
Jeff Waters - guitar
Curran Murphy - guitar
Russ Bergquist - bass
Randy Black - drums

References

Annihilator (band) albums
2003 live albums
AFM Records live albums
Live thrash metal albums